Branch Township may refer to:

 Branch Township, Michigan
 Branch Township, Schuylkill County, Pennsylvania

See also
 North Branch Township (disambiguation)
 South Branch Township (disambiguation)
 West Branch Township (disambiguation)